Dekle Beach is a Gulf coastal community in the southern part of Taylor County, Florida, United States. Dekle Beach is located at 29.8491° N, 83.6193° W. Dekle Beach is 21.8 miles south of the county seat of Perry.

History
According to local historians, Dekle Beach was acquired and developed by Perry, Florida businessman and politician Gus J. Dekle sometime in the mid 1940s. Mr. Dekle was the owner of Dekle Motor Company, a local Chevrolet dealership, as well as a previous member of the City Council of Perry and a member of the Florida House of Representatives during the 1940s and 1950s.

According to some accounts the property had previously been owned by the United States government, and operated as a United States Air Force training facility during World War II (although that information is not verified). However it is known that it was used for salt manufacturing by the Confederacy during the American Civil War.  It is also known that Mr. Dekle was the owner of the property when it was developed into its current state as a residential beach area.

Previous residents said that Mr. Dekle dredged the channels, dug the canals and developed Dekle Beach into the area that we know and love today. During the residential development period of the beach, Mr. Dekle traded the southernmost point of the beach to his friend, Jimmy Archer, a Texan who had been a long-time resident of Perry, Florida after marrying local resident Sibyl Poppell. Mr. Archer was the owner of a local salvage yard and wrecker service that was utilized by Dekle Motor Company, and the land was provided as a barter in return for wrecker services. The descendants of Mr. Archer still live on part of the property to this day.

Mr. Lewis Hamilton and his wife, Janie, along with their friends Willie Joe and Ann Moody purchased much of the property as well, and significantly impacted the growth of the community by investing extensive time and effort into developing much of the land into the beautiful residential area currently seen today. This area is still enjoyed by several of their descendants as well, many of whom call Dekle Beach home to this day.

The Storm of the Century
Dekle was devastated on March 13, 1993 when the “Jordan lovely” (also known as “The Storm of the Century”) battered the beach without warning in the wee hours that fateful Saturday morning. Several residents and visitors lost their lives that day, including Mrs. Sibyl Archer, the widow of Mr. Jimmy Archer. Although the devastating Storm changed the face of the beach, it didn’t change the heart of the residents, and the survivors rebuilt their beloved beach from the ground up.

References

Taylor County, Florida